The 2019-20 Western Michigan Broncos men's ice hockey season was the 46th season of play for the program and the 7th in the NCHC conference. The Broncos represented Western Michigan University and were coached by Andy Murray, in his 9th season.

On March 12, 2020, NCHC announced that the tournament was cancelled due to the coronavirus pandemic, before any games were played.

Roster

As of August 18, 2019.

Standings

Schedule and Results

|-
!colspan=12 style="color:white; background:#6C4023; " | Exhibition

|-
!colspan=12 style="color:white; background:#6C4023; " | 

|-
!colspan=12 style="color:white; background:#6C4023; " | Regular Season

|-
!colspan=12 style="color:white; background:#6C4023; " | 
|- align="center" bgcolor="#e0e0e0"
|colspan=12|Tournament Cancelled

Scoring statistics

Goaltending statistics

Rankings

References

Western Michigan Broncos men's ice hockey seasons
Western Michigan Broncos
Western Michigan Broncos
Western Michigan Broncos
Western Michigan Broncos